10 Minster Yard is an historic building in the city of York, North Yorkshire, England. A Grade II listed building, located at the corner of Minster Gates at Minster Yard, the building dates to around 1763. It was part of the now-closed Minster School, and was built as the home of dean John Fountayne. 10 Minster Gates is located in the rear of the building.

It is around 90 years older than the buildings behind it, numbers 2–8 Minster Gates, which are not on the same alignments as 10 Minster Yard and 10 and 10a Minster Gates.

References

10
Houses in North Yorkshire
Buildings and structures in North Yorkshire
1763 establishments in England
Grade II listed buildings in York
Grade II listed houses
18th century in York